Yurdhai-ye Abdol Yusefi (also Romanized as Yūrdhāī-ye ‘Abdol Yūsefī) is a village in Sarvestan Rural District, in the Central District of Sarvestan County, Fars Province, Iran. At the 2006 census, its population was 168, in 34 families.

References 

Populated places in Sarvestan County